Mbonge is a town and capital of the MbongeDistrict  and clan in Cameroon. The town derives its name as the chief and first major settlement of the Mbonge clan. It was formerly known as Liène during German rule in Cameroon.

The town is also claimed by Ambazonian separatist as part of the Equatorial State territory.

See also
Communes of Cameroon

References

 Site de la primature - Élections municipales 2002 
 Contrôle de gestion et performance des services publics communaux des villes camerounaises - Thèse de Donation Avele, Université Montesquieu Bordeaux IV 
 Charles Nanga, La réforme de l’administration territoriale au Cameroun à la lumière de la loi constitutionnelle n° 96/06 du 18 janvier 1996, Mémoire ENA. 

Communes of Southwest Region (Cameroon)